The 2004 Italian Grand Prix (officially the Formula 1 Gran Premio Vodafone d'Italia 2004) was a Formula One motor race held on 12 September 2004 at the Autodromo Nazionale di Monza. It was Race 15 of 18 in the 2004 FIA Formula One World Championship. Ferrari took a 1–2 in front of the delighted Tifosi, with Rubens Barrichello ahead of teammate Michael Schumacher. Both cars had to make their way through the field from the back, Barrichello having made an early pitstop after choosing the wrong tyres at the start and Schumacher having spun on the first lap. This was the last race for Giorgio Pantano.

The race was perhaps best known for speed records set during the race. These records would stand until the 2018 edition.

In the Minardi pit garage, the car of Gianmaria Bruni caught fire after fuel escaped from the hose onto the hot bodywork during a routine pit-stop, and it was put out without any serious injury. Bruni inhaled some of the extinguishant and was having trouble breathing and so the team decided to retire the car.

This race was Scuderia Ferrari's 700th start in a World Championship event as a team.

Friday drivers
The bottom 6 teams in the 2003 Constructors' Championship were entitled to run a third car in free practice on Friday. These drivers drove on Friday but did not compete in qualifying or the race.

Classification

Qualifying 

 Nick Heidfeld was demoted to 20th place after receiving a ten-place penalty for an engine change in Friday practice.

Race 

 Coulthard and Heidfeld started the race from the pitlane.

Championship standings after the race 
Bold text indicates the World Champions.

Drivers' Championship standings

Constructors' Championship standings

Note: Only the top five positions are included for both sets of standings.

Footnotes

References

External links 

Comments on 2004 Italian GP

Italian Grand Prix
Italian Grand Prix
Grand Prix
September 2004 sports events in Europe